Kühn is a German word meaning "bold" and may refer to:

Kühn (surname), a family name 
a nickname for rulers and generals
Karl der Kühne (1433-1477), (Carl the Bold)
Philipp der Kühne (1342-1404), (Philip the Bold)
Kühn (Lower Bavaria), a village in the county of Freyung-Grafenau in Lower Bavaria

Kühn is part of the following names:
Kühndorf, a village in the district of Schmalkalden-Meiningen in Germany
Wendt & Kühn, a manufacturer of Ore Mountain wooden figures and music boxes
Karosseriewerke Otto Kühn, a former company from Halle (Saale), Germany
Kühn & Kollegen, a TV programme
Clemens Kühn, German music theorist

See also
 Kuhn, a surname
 Kühne

ru:Кюн